John Jacob Rogers (August 18, 1881 – March 28, 1925) was an American politician and a member of the United States House of Representatives from Massachusetts.

Life and career
Rogers was born in Lowell, Massachusetts, and graduated from Harvard University in 1904 and from Harvard Law School in 1907. He practiced law in Lowell, starting in 1908. Rogers was a member of the Lowell city government in 1911, school commissioner in 1912, and was elected as a Republican to the Sixty-third and to the six succeeding Congresses and served from March 4, 1913, until his death. During the First World War, Rogers enlisted on September 12, 1918, as a private with the Twenty-ninth Training Battery, Tenth Training Battalion, Field Artillery, Fourth Central Officers’ Training School, and served until honorably discharged on November 29, 1918.

Rogers is remembered as "The father of the Foreign Service" due to his sponsorship of the 1924 Foreign Service Act, also known as the Rogers Act.

Rogers died in Washington, D.C., of appendicitis on March 28, 1925, and was interred at Lowell Cemetery in Lowell, Massachusetts.

His wife, Edith Nourse Rogers, who would end up being the longest serving female of Congress for over 60 years, succeeded him in Congress.

See also
List of United States Congress members who died in office (1900–49)

References

1881 births
1925 deaths
Politicians from Lowell, Massachusetts
Harvard Law School alumni
Massachusetts lawyers
American military personnel of World War I
Republican Party members of the United States House of Representatives from Massachusetts
20th-century American politicians
19th-century American lawyers
20th-century American lawyers